Mădălina Maria Zamfirescu (born 31 October 1994) is a Romanian handballer playing for SCM Gloria Buzău (women's handball) and the Romanian national team.

Achievements 
Liga Naţională:
Silver Medalist: 2017
Romanian Cup:
Winner: 2021
Finalist:
Romanian Supercup:Winner: 2021Finalist: 2019
World University Championship:
Silver Medalist: 2016

References

External links

1994 births
Living people
Sportspeople from Râmnicu Vâlcea
Romanian female handball players
CS Minaur Baia Mare (women's handball) players
SCM Râmnicu Vâlcea (handball) players
Expatriate handball players
Romanian expatriate sportspeople in Hungary